Alfred Frederik Elias Grenander (June 26, 1863 in Skövde, Sweden – March 14, 1931 in Berlin ) architect, and an older brother of Henning Grenander (1874–1958)
Henning Grenander (1874–1958) Swedish figure skater, a younger brother of Alfred Fredrik Elias Grenander (1863–1931)
Mary Elizabeth Grenander (21 November 1918 – 28 May 1998) professor of English and philanthropist
Ulf Grenander (born 23 July 1923 in Västervik, Sweden) statistician and a professor of applied mathematics